I'm Still Here... Damn It is an album released by singer/comedian/actress Sandra Bernhard. The album is a live recording of her one-woman show of the same title.

Live show
In Bernhard's live performances she satirized celebrity culture while commenting on events of the time. Among the topics she addresses: the death of Princess Diana, Mariah Carey, Courtney Love, modern technology, religion, the world of high fashion and relationships.

In 1997 the show ran at the Westbeth Theater Center in Greenwich Village, and also in 1998 at the Booth Theater in New York.

Recording
The CD combines comedic monologues and musical performances taken from the live show. The final track, "On the Runway Remix", is a studio-produced track, produced by Eve Nelson that recreates the live performance of the track by the same name; the remix peaked at number 39 on Billboard’s Dance Club Songs Chart in April 1999. Nelson also produced "Perfection" on Sandra Bernhard's 2008 album "Everything Bad & Beautiful".

Track listing

DVD + VHS
The DVD for I'm Still Here... Damn It! was released on February 22, 2000. The DVD is Unrated and contains the following single bonus feature:
30 minutes of footage not seen in the broadcast version.
The DVD is directed by Marty Callner.

The Unrated VHS was also released. But it does not contain the bonus footage.

References

Sandra Bernhard albums
1998 live albums
2000 live albums
2000 video albums
Live video albums
1990s comedy albums
TVT Records live albums